The phonemic inventory of Maldivian (Dhivehi) consists of 29 consonants and 10 vowels. Like other modern Indo-Aryan languages the Maldivian phonemic inventory shows an opposition of long and short vowels, of dental and retroflex consonants as well as single and geminate consonants.

  is developed as a sound from the diphthong .
 The short open back vowel is phonetically central .

 The status of /ɲ/ as a phoneme is unclear. Except for two words, /ɲamɲam/ cynometra cauliflora (a kind of fruit) and /ɲaʋijani/ 'Gnaviyani' (alphabet letter), the /ɲ/ only occurs as the result of the fusion of /n/ and /i/: /du:ni/ 'bird', /du:ɲɲeʔ/ 'a bird'.

Dental and retroflex stops are contrastive in Maldivian. For example: maḍun means ‘quietly’ madun means ‘seldom’.

Maldivian and Sinhalese are the only Indo-Aryan languages that have prenasalized stops.

The influence of other languages has played a great role in Maldivian phonology. For example, the phoneme  comes entirely from foreign influence:  ('judge') is from Persian,  ('past') is from Urdu.

The phoneme  also occurs only in borrowed words in Modern Standard Maldivian:  ('report'). At one point, Maldivian did not have the phoneme , and  occurred in the language without contrastive aspiration. Historical documents from the 11th century, for example, show 'five' rendered as  whereas today it is pronounced . 

In standard Maldivian when the phoneme  occurs in the final position of a word it changes to  intervocalically when inflected.

/ʂ/ is peculiar to Dhivehi among Indo-Aryan languages. In some dialects, it is pronounced as a [ɽ̊]. The /ʂ/ is related historically and allophonically to /ʈ/ (but not to Sanskrit /ʂ/ or /ɕ/). Sometime after the 12th century, the intervocalic /ʈ/ became [ʂ] /raʈu/ 'island' (12th c.), [raʂu] 'island'. The /ʈ/ is retained in geminate clusters like /feʂuni:/ 'started', /faʈʈaifi/ 'has caused to start'. The contrast between /ʂ/ and /ʈ/ was made through loan words like /koʂani:/ 'cutting', /koʈari/ 'room'.

Borrowed phonemes
Modern Standard Maldivian has borrowed many phonemes from Arabic. However, most Maldivians do not pronounce the sounds exactly. The following table shows the phonemes that have been borrowed from Arabic/Persian together with their transliteration into Tāna, and their original and native pronunciation.

Phonotactics
Native Maldivian words do not allow initial consonant clusters; the syllable structure is (C)V(C) (i.e. one vowel with the option of a consonant in the onset and/or coda).

References

Maldivian language
Indo-Aryan phonologies